Mangga Besar is an administrative village of Taman Sari, West Jakarta, Indonesia.This village is adjacent to Pinangsia Road (Glodok) in the north, Ciliwung River to the west, Tangki to the east and Mangga Besar Road in the south. The neighborhood is a popular nightlife destination in Jakarta.

History
Historically, the area is one of the first 'lokalisasi' area of the Batavian era. In the past, the Batavian community knew PSK as 'cabo', which was adapted from 'caibo' - a mandarin term for ladies of the night. Visitors were VOC officials and Chinese traders. Population of this neighborhood are predominantly ethnic Chinese Indonesian like the adjacent Chinatown of Glodok. There are at least 3 Chinese temples within the neighborhood. Vihara Avalokitesvara. temple was built in 1936, has altars of Buddha and Guan Yin (Goddess of Mercy).  Husada Hospital, which was previously known as Jang Seng Le is located in the area, was established in 1924, making it one of the longest-serving hospitals in Jakarta.

Culinary, club, cafe and karaoke
Mangga Besar is famous as a notorious nightlife area of Jakarta. Not only notorious as the center of nightlife, Mangga Besar is also known for its tempting eateries.  A variety of Chinese food and also a variety of food from the Indonesian archipelago under  influence of Chinese culture, which is the very unique and interesting about foods of Mangga Besar. Chinese dishes made from dog, turtle, cobras, frogs and lizard meat can be found here.

Numerous bars, nightclubs, karaoke, cafe, massage parlors and sex-hotel located in the area. Lokasari Plaza is a shopping mall which also houses hotels, nightclubs, bar, karaoke and massage parlor.

Transportation
The area is served by TransJakarta corridor 1, Blok M-Kota route. Mangga Besar railway station of Jakarta metro rail is located in the neighborhood.

See also

Glodok

References

Administrative villages in Jakarta
Shopping districts and streets in Indonesia
Tourist attractions in Jakarta
Red-light districts in Indonesia
West Jakarta